David Spence may refer to:

 David Spence (VC) (1818–1877), Scottish recipient of the Victoria Cross
 David Spence (Canadian politician) (1867–1940), member of the Canadian House of Commons
 Dave Spence (born 1958), candidate for governor in Missouri
 David Spence (Manitoba politician) (1824–1885), politician in Manitoba, Canada
 David Spence (mathematician) (1926–2003), New Zealand and British mathematician
 David Spence (rubber chemistry) (1881–1957), pioneer in the field of rubber chemistry
 Dave Spence (cricketer) (born 1930), New Zealand cricketer
 David Jerome Spence (1873–1955), Canadian architect, designer of such buildings as Montreal's Martlet House
 David H. N. Spence (1925-1985) British botanist